IMAM (Industrie Meccaniche e Aeronautiche Meridionali) was an Italian aircraft manufacturer founded in 1923. In 1955 it merged into Aerfer.

See also

 List of Italian companies

External links 

 
Italian brands
Vehicle manufacturing companies established in 1923
Italian companies established in 1923
Defunct aircraft manufacturers of Italy
Società Italiana Ernesto Breda
Aerfer
Companies based in Campania
Vehicle manufacturing companies disestablished in 1955
1955 disestablishments in Italy